Wildeman may refer to:

Dick Wildeman, candidate in the Hamilton, Ontario municipal election, 2003
Émile Auguste Joseph De Wildeman (1866–1947), Belgian botanist
Richard Wildeman, computer animator, part of the award-winning Science North Production Team
Wildeman River, river in southern Papua, Indonesia

See also
Waldman
Wild Man
Wildemann
Wildman (disambiguation)
Wildmen
Wildmon

nl:Wildeman